Thurayur  is a village in Kozhikode district in the state of Kerala, India.

Demographics
At the 2001 India census, Thurayur had a population of 14009 with 6641 males and 7368 females.

Transportation
Thurayur village connects to other parts of India through Koyilandy town, and vatakara town.  The nearest airports are at Kannur and Kozhikode.  The nearest railway station is at Payyoli.  It is a small village surrounded by water in all the sides. the northern border is the Kuttiady river flowing from the western ghats to the Arabian sea. The southern side is Akalappuzha backwaters, a beautiful natural area to be visited. The village is a part of Old Payyormala. The bungalow of British rulers is still alive in this village alongside of the Kuttiady river. The Kanoli canal joins at Kuttiady river at this small town, and by this another name was also given to this small town that is 'Payyoli Cheerpp'.

References

Koyilandy area